Aim was a never-launched general interest English language service that eventually sold their assets to Allarcom Pay-TV in early 1984.  Allarcom Pay-TV was permitted to run Superchannel on an intern basis until they could launch a regional service for BC and Yukon.  In August 1984, Allarcom Pay-TV consolidated Aim and Ontario Independent Pay Television until a single operation and as of September 1, 1984 Allarcom agreed to operate Superchannel as a regional Pay channel servicing the western provinces (Manitoba, Saskatchewan, Alberta, British Columbia ) and both territories (Northwest Territories, Yukon).

References

Defunct television networks in Canada
Television channels and stations established in 1983
1984 disestablishments in Canada
1983 establishments in Canada 
Television channels and stations disestablished in 1984